Ricardo John (born 10 April 1995) is a Trinidadian professional footballer who plays for Harrisburg Heat in the Major Arena Soccer League.

Club career

Toronto FC II 
On 3 August 2016, John signed with United Soccer League side Toronto FC II, the reserve team of Major League Soccer club Toronto FC. He also played two games for the third team, scoring twice.

Luis Ángel Firpo 
John signed with Luis Ángel Firpo for the Clausura 2018 tournament. John contributed to that the team which was saved from relegation.

John re-signed with Luis Ángel Firpo for the Apertura 2018 tournament. With the team of Usulután John experienced a serious economic, administrative and sports crisis during the tournament and serious delays in salary payments. Days later John left the team.

Juticalpa
On 22 August 2019, John signed with Juticalpa in Honduras.

Harrisburg Heat
In October 2021, John entered the Major Arena Soccer League by signing with the Harrisburg Heat.

References

External links 
 
 

1995 births
Living people
Association football forwards
Trinidad and Tobago footballers
People from Tunapuna–Piarco
Trinidad and Tobago expatriate footballers
Virginia Tech Hokies men's soccer players
Central F.C. players
Toronto FC II players
C.D. Luis Ángel Firpo footballers
Juticalpa F.C. players
TT Pro League players
USL Championship players
Salvadoran Primera División players
Trinidad and Tobago under-20 international footballers
2015 CONCACAF U-20 Championship players
Trinidad and Tobago international footballers
Expatriate soccer players in the United States
Trinidad and Tobago expatriate sportspeople in the United States
Expatriate soccer players in Canada
Trinidad and Tobago expatriate sportspeople in Canada
Expatriate footballers in El Salvador
Trinidad and Tobago expatriate sportspeople in El Salvador
Expatriate footballers in Honduras
Trinidad and Tobago expatriate sportspeople in Honduras
Harrisburg Heat (MASL) players
Footballers at the 2015 Pan American Games